Alberta Provincial Highway No. 686, also known as Highway 686, is an east–west highway in northern Alberta, Canada.

Highway 686 comprises the western segment of the partially constructed Northern Alberta East–West Highway Corridor.

History 

In 2015, the Parsons Access Road was opened in Fort McMurray which connected Highway 63 to the developing residential neighbourhood Parsons Creek, with interchanges at Highway 63 (known as the Parsons Creek Interchange) and the access road currently referred to as the North Parsons Gateway.

Future

East–West Connector 
The Province of Alberta is studying an east–west highway connection between Fort McMurray and Red Earth Creek, connecting with Highway 686 north of Peerless Lake. As part of the highway, the Fort McMurray portion would be a short freeway with connections to Parsons Creek and Confederation Way/Thickwood Boulevard. The Parsons Creek Interchange at Highway 63 was staged to accommodate an eastern extension across the Athabasca River.

East Clearwater Highway 
Following the 2016 Fort McMurray Wildfire, the Regional Municipality of Wood Buffalo council unanimously voted in support of a second highway that would serve as an alternate evacuation route tentatively called the "East Clearwater Highway". It would run east of Fort McMurray as an extension of Highway 881 near Anzac, crossing the Clearwater River and continue north towards Fort MacKay. As part of the project, Highway 686 would continue east across the Athabasca River and connect with the new highway.

Major intersections 
Starting from the west end of Highway 686:

References

External links 

Northeast Provincial Highway Projects by Alberta Transportation

686
Proposed roads in Canada
686
Transport in Fort McMurray